Morad Al-Soudani (born 28 October 1989) is a Saudi football player.

References

1989 births
Living people
Saudi Arabian footballers
Al-Ahli Saudi FC players
Al-Raed FC players
Al-Nahda Club (Saudi Arabia) players
Al-Ansar FC (Medina) players
Al-Watani Club players
Al-Faisaly FC players
Saudi First Division League players
Saudi Professional League players
Association football fullbacks